The 2003–04 UEFA Champions League was the 12th season of UEFA's premier European club football tournament, the UEFA Champions League, since its rebranding from the European Cup in 1992, and the 49th tournament overall. This was the first UEFA Champions League edition to feature a new format with a 16-team knockout round instead of a second group stage.

The competition was won by Portugal's Porto, who defeated Monaco of France 3–0 at the Arena AufSchalke in Gelsenkirchen, Germany. This was Portugal's first win since 1987, and Porto's second European trophy in two years, following their UEFA Cup success from the previous season. This was the second consecutive victory in a European cup for Porto coach José Mourinho, who beat Monaco coached by Didier Deschamps, a two-time winner of the competition as a player.

Milan were the defending champions, but were eliminated by Deportivo La Coruña in the quarter-finals.

Qualification
A total of 72 teams from 48 UEFA member associations participated in the 2003–04 UEFA Champions League. Liechtenstein (who don't have their own domestic league) as well as Andorra and San Marino are not participating. Also not admitted was Azerbaijan, which was suspended by UEFA. Each association enters a certain number of clubs to the Champions League based on its league coefficient; associations with a higher league coefficients may enter more clubs than associations with a lower league coefficient, but no association may enter more than four teams.

Associations 1–3 each have four teams qualify.
Associations 4–6 each have three teams qualify.
Associations 7–15 each have two teams qualify.
Associations 16–52 (except Azerbaijan, Liechtenstein, Andorra and San Marino) each have one team qualify.

Association ranking
For the 2003–04 UEFA Champions League, the associations are allocated places according to their 2002 UEFA country coefficients, which takes into account their performance in European competitions from 1997–98 to 2001–02.

Distribution
Since the title holders (Milan) also qualified for the Champions League Third qualifying round through their domestic league, one Third qualifying round spot was vacated. Due to this, as well as due to suspension of Azerbaijan, the following changes to the default access list are made:
The champions of association 16 (Switzerland) are promoted from the second qualifying round to the third qualifying round.
The champions of associations 26, 27 and 28 (Romania, Hungary and Slovenia) are promoted from the first qualifying round to the second qualifying round.

Teams
League positions of the previous season shown in parentheses (TH: Champions League title holders).

Notes

Round and draw dates
The schedule of the competition is as follows (all draws are held at UEFA headquarters in Nyon, Switzerland, unless stated otherwise).

Qualifying rounds

First qualifying round 

|}

Second qualifying round 

|}

Third qualifying round 

|}

Group stage 

Title holders, 16 winners from the third qualifying round, 9 champions from countries ranked 1–10, and six second-placed teams from countries ranked 1–6 were drawn into eight groups of four teams each. The top two teams in each group advanced to the Champions League play-offs, while the third-placed teams advanced to the Third Round of the UEFA Cup.

Tiebreakers, if necessary, were applied in the following order:
 Points earned in head-to-head matches between the tied teams.
 Total goals scored in head-to-head matches between the tied teams.
 Away goals scored in head-to-head matches between the tied teams.
 Cumulative goal difference in all group matches.
 Total goals scored in all group matches.
 Higher UEFA coefficient going into the competition.

Real Sociedad, Celta Vigo, Stuttgart and Partizan made their debut appearance in the group stage. This season became the first in the history of the Champions League in which three Greek clubs will play in the group stage

Group A

Group B

Group C

Group D

Group E

Group F

Group G

Group H

Knockout stage

Bracket

Round of 16 

|}

Quarter-finals 

|}

Semi-finals 

|}

Final 

As winners of the competition, Porto went on to represent Europe at the 2004 Intercontinental Cup.

Statistics
Statistics exclude qualifying rounds.

Top goalscorers

Source: Top Scorers – Final – Wednesday 26 May 2004 (after match)

Top assists

Source:

See also 
 2003–04 UEFA Cup
 2003 UEFA Intertoto Cup
 2003–04 UEFA Women's Cup

References

External links 

 2003–04 All matches – season at UEFA website
 2003–04 season at UEFA website
 European Club Results at RSSSF
 All scorers 2003–04 UEFA Champions League (excluding qualifying round) according to protocols UEFA + all scorers qualifying round
 2003/04 UEFA Champions League – results and line-ups (archive)
 
 2003/04 List of participants

 
UEFA Champions League seasons
1